This list of Mesozoic theropod type specimens is a list of fossils that are the official standard-bearers for inclusion in the Mesozoic species and genera of the dinosaur clade Theropoda, which includes the carnivorous dinosaurs like Tyrannosaurus and Velociraptor, their herbivorous relatives like the therizinosaurs, and birds. Type specimens are those that are definitionally members of biological taxa, and additional specimens can only be "referred" to these taxa if an expert deems them sufficiently similar to the type.

The list

See also 

 List of ornithopod type specimens
 List of marginocephalian type specimens
 List of thyreophoran type specimens
 List of other ornithischian type specimens

References

Lists of dinosaur specimens
Mesozoic fossil record